The 2015 Open Montpellier Méditerranée Métropole Hérault was a professional tennis tournament played on outdoor clay courts. It was the tenth edition of the tournament and part of the 2015 ITF Women's Circuit, offering a total of $50,000+H in prize money. It took place in Montpellier, France, on 15–21 June 2015.

Singles main draw entrants

Seeds 

 1 Rankings as of 8 June 2015

Other entrants 
The following players received wildcards into the singles main draw:
  Kinnie Laisné
  Sherazad Reix
  Constance Sibille
  Jade Suvrijn

The following players received entry from the qualifying draw:
  Myrtille Georges
  Ivana Jorović
  Cristina Sánchez Quintanar
  Natalia Vikhlyantseva

The following player received entry by a protected ranking:
  Victoria Kan

Champions

Singles

 Lourdes Domínguez Lino def.  Sílvia Soler Espinosa, 6–4, 6–3

Doubles

 María Irigoyen /  Barbora Krejčíková def.  Laura Siegemund /  Renata Voráčová, 6–4, 6–2

External links 
 2015 Open Montpellier Méditerranée Métropole Hérault at ITFtennis.com
 Official website 

2015 ITF Women's Circuit
2015
2015 in French tennis